Counamama is a river in French Guiana that has its source in the mountains in the south of the Iracoubo municipality. It passes the eponymous town, and flows into the Iracoubo River near the coast. The Iracoubo empties into the Atlantic Ocean  later.

See also
List of rivers of French Guiana
List of rivers of the Americas by coastline

References

Rivers of French Guiana
Rivers of France
Iracoubo